Mae Bamber was mayor of Southport, Lancashire.

She was in the United States in 1958, while mayor, to visit three cities there called Southport.

She was a guest on the American version of What's My Line? on March 23, 1958.

References

Year of birth missing
Year of death missing
People from Southport
Politicians from Lancashire
Politicians from Merseyside